Chinese Buddhism or Han Buddhism is a Chinese form of Mahayana Buddhism which has shaped Chinese culture in a wide variety of areas including art, politics, literature, philosophy, medicine and material culture. Chinese Buddhism is the largest institutionalized religion in Mainland China. Currently, there are an estimated 185 to 250 million Chinese Buddhists in the People's Republic of China. It is also a major religion in Taiwan, Singapore, and Malaysia, as well as among the Chinese Diaspora. 

Buddhism was first introduced to China during the Han Dynasty (202 BCE–220 CE). The translation of a large body of Indian Buddhist scriptures into Chinese and the inclusion of these translations (along with Taoist and Confucian works) into a Chinese Buddhist canon had far-reaching implications for the dissemination of Buddhism throughout the East Asian cultural sphere, including Korea, Japan and Vietnam. Chinese Buddhism also developed various unique traditions of Buddhist thought and practice, including Tiantai, Huayan, Chan Buddhism and Pure Land Buddhism.

From its inception, Chinese Buddhism has been influenced by native Chinese religions and philosophy, especially Confucianism and Taoism, but also Chinese folk religion.

History

The establishment of Buddhism in China 
Buddhist missionaries began bringing Buddhism to China during the Han dynasty (202 BCE - 220 CE) and the religion was present in China at the beginning of the common era. Buddhist missionaries made use of both the overland Central Asian Silk Road and the maritime routes. Initially Buddhism was poorly understood and often confused with and mixed with Daoism. The Chinese saw many similarities between the two religions. There was also much criticism leveled at the new foreign religion by the Confucian elites.   

One of the central tasks of the initial missionaries was the translation of Buddhist texts. The first surviving translations of Buddhist texts into Chinese were those of the 2nd century Parthian An Shigao (Ch. ), who worked in the capital of Luoyang. His work was followed by the extensive Mahāyāna translations of the Kushan monk Lokakṣema (Ch. , active c. 164–186 CE) as well as the work of Dharmaraksa (3rd century). 

During this early period the Dharmaguptaka school was very influential in establishing Buddhism in China. This resulted in the widespread adoption of the Dharmaguptaka school's Vinaya (monastic rule) by all Chinese Buddhist schools.

The arrival of the Kuchan scholar Kumārajīva (334–413 CE) was a key event. Unlike the previous translators, Kumārajīva was supported by the state and given the title of national preceptor. The numerous high quality translations of his translation team had a great impact on Chinese Buddhism. He is also known for introducing the Madhyamaka school of Buddhist philosophy, which would later be called Sanlun (the "Three Treatise school"). His work also established a thoroughly Indic foundation for Chinese Buddhist philosophy, which previously had been heavily influenced by Daoist philosophy. 

Another important translator of this period was Paramārtha (Zhēndì, 499-569 CE). Paramārtha along with his team of Chinese disciples translated numerous works on Abhidharma, Yogacara philosophy and other Mahayana texts.

The Dunhuang and Yungang cave complexes are a great example of early Chinese Buddhist art.

The development of a Chinese Buddhism 
The 6th and 7th centuries saw a flowering of new and unique Chinese Buddhist traditions, including:

 The Tiantai school was mainly founded by the efforts of master Zhiyi (538–597 CE) and was based on the Lotus Sutra and the works of Zhiyi.
 The Huayan (Avatamsaka Sutra) school, based on the works of Chinese masters like Dushun (557–640), Zhiyan (602–668) and Fazang (643–712).
 The Pure Land tradition, which is based on the veneration of Amitabha and the works of Pure Land masters like Tanluan (476–542), Daochuo (562–645), and Shandao (613–81).
 Chan Buddhism, based on the teachings of various Chan masters such as Bodhidharma, Dazu Huike (487–593), Sengcan (?–606), Dayi Daoxin (580–651) and Hongren (601–674).
During the Tang Dynasty (618–907 CE), the monk Xuanzang (602-664) journeyed to India and back, and wrote extensive and detailed reports of his findings, which have subsequently become important for the study of India during this period. Xuanzang also brought back many Buddhist texts and led a translation team which is responsible for many influential Chinese translations of classic Buddhist works. His efforts led to the establishment of the idealistic Yogacara (Consciousness-only) tradition in East Asia.

The Tang era was one of the golden ages of Buddhism in China. During this time, a sinicized Buddhism was widely accepted and practiced throughout the empire at this time, with many monasteries and temples. Buddhism was popular with all social classes and was very influential on Chinese culture. Buddhist themes can be found in much of the literature of this period, such as in the works of famous poets like Wang Wei (701 – 761) and Bo Juyi (772 – 846). The various artistic complexes from this period, such as the Longmen Grottoes also attest to the artistic vibrancy of Chinese Buddhism at this time. 

A famous proponent of Buddhism during the Tang era was empress Wu Zetian (r. 690–705) and she is known for her promotion of the Longmen cave complex. She also depicted herself as a bodhisattva.

The next important event in the history of Chinese Buddhism was the arrival of Śubhakarasiṃha, Vajrabodhi, and Amoghavajra, and their establishment of Esoteric Buddhism in China from CE 716 to 720 during the reign of emperor Xuanzong. This Chinese form of Vajrayana Buddhism now became popular with the elites and by the time of emperor Tang Daizong (r. 762–779) its influence among the upper classes was significant. 
 
The Great Anti-Buddhist Persecution (841–845) under Emperor Tang Wuzong greatly impacted and weakened the Buddhist institutions in China. Perhaps the main reason for this persecution was the Chinese state's need for tax and wealth. 

The Five Dynasties and Ten Kingdoms period (907–960/979), an era of great political upheaval and civil war also negatively impacted Chinese Buddhism. Various Chinese Buddhist traditions contracted or died out during this period.

The Song Dynasty (960–1279) saw the flourishing of Chinese Buddhist culture. During the Song, Chan Buddhism grew to become the most influential school with close ties to the imperial government and a highly organized system of temple rank and administration system developed. It was during this time that the classic Five Houses of Chan developed. Many classic Chan texts were written during this era, such as the famed koan collections of the Linji school, like the Blue Cliff Record (1125) and The Gateless Gate (1228). 

Likewise, during this time, the works of Hongzhi Zhengjue (1091-1157) developed the silent sitting method of "silent illumination". Both of these traditions of Chan practice were very influential (and remain so) on East Asian Zen Buddhism (including on Japanese Zen, Korean Seon and Vietnamese Thien).

The Yuan dynasty (1271–1368) patronized Tibetan Buddhism and thus during this period there was a steady growth of this tradition in China. A common perception was that this patronage of lamas caused corrupt forms of tantra to become widespread. When the Yuan dynasty was overthrown and the Ming dynasty was established, the Tibetan lamas were expelled from the court, and this form of Buddhism was denounced as not being an orthodox path.

During the Ming dynasty (1368–1644) there was a revival of the study of native Chinese traditions like Tiantai, Huayan, Yogacara and most monks belonged to the two dominant Chan schools: Linji and Caodong. At this point in its history Chinese Buddhism had also become quite eclectic, drawing from all the main Chinese traditions. An example of this is the figure of Hanshan Deqing, one of the great reformers of Chinese Buddhism. Like many of his contemporaries, he advocated the dual practice of the Chan and Pure Land methods. He also directed practitioners in the use of mantras as well as scripture reading. He was also renowned as a lecturer and commentator and admired for his strict adherence to the precepts.

Modernity 
 
During the Qing dynasty (1644–1911), the imperial court shifted its support to the Gelug school of Tibetan Buddhism. Chinese Buddhism suffered much during the various imperial and internal conflicts of the Qing dynasty, especially the devastating Taiping rebellion (December 1850 – August 1864), which saw many temples destroyed and scriptures burned by rebels. This era also saw the arrival of Christian missionaries to China, a right which had been granted to Western powers after the Opium Wars.

During the Republican Period (1912-1949), there were various attempts to reform and modernize Chinese Buddhism and to respond to the various challenges of modernity. The most notable of these reformers were the Humanistic Buddhists like Taixu and Yin Shun. Humanistic Buddhism sought to move away from ritualistic and otherworldly obsessions to embrace more this worldly pursuits like education and charitable work. There was also a revival of Chinese Chan by Hsu Yun and Sheng Yen, as well as a revival of Tiantai Buddhism by Dixian and Tanxu (1875 – 1963). 
 
After the communist takeover of Mainland China, many Buddhists and monastics followed the Republican exodus to Taiwan. In the latter half of the twentieth century, many new Buddhist temples and organizations were set up by the exiles in Taiwan, including Fo Guang Shan, Dharma Drum Mountain and Tzu Chi. These organizations also became influential back in Mainland China after the end of the Cultural Revolution.

Chinese Buddhism suffered extensive repression, persecution and destruction during the Cultural Revolution (from 1966 until Mao Zedong's death in 1976). Maoist propaganda depicted Buddhism as one of the four olds, as a superstitious instrument of the ruling class and as counter-revolutionary. Buddhist Clergy were attacked, disrobed, arrested and sent to camps. Buddhist writings were burned. Buddhist temples, monasteries and art were systematically destroyed and Buddhist lay believers ceased any public displays of their religion.

During the normalization period (Boluan Fanzheng, 1977 to early 80s) led by Deng Xiaoping, a new revival of Chinese Buddhism began to take place. This was a period which saw the restoration of damaged Buddhist temples like Guoqing Temple and Guanghua Temple as well as the return of monastic ordination and Buddhist institutions. Monks like Zhenchan (真禪) and Mengcan (夢參), who were trained in the Chan and Huayan traditions, traveled widely throughout China as well as other countries such as the United States and lectured on both Chan and Huayan teachings. Monks who had fled overseas were also allowed back into the mainland. 

During the late 20th century, Chinese Buddhism also became established in some Western countries, especially in the USA. The first Chinese master to teach Westerners in North America was Hsuan Hua, who went on to found the City Of Ten Thousand Buddhas. Chuang Yen Monastery (New York) and Hsi Lai Temple (Los Angeles) are other large Chinese Buddhist temples in the USA.

Teaching and practice

Doctrine and texts 
Chinese Buddhism is a sinicized form of Mahāyāna Buddhism which draws on the Chinese Buddhist Canon (大藏經, Dàzàngjīng, "Great Storage of Scriptures") as well as numerous Chinese traditions. Chinese Buddhism focuses on studying Mahayana sutras and Mahāyāna treatises and draws its main doctrines from these sources. Some of the most important scriptures in Chinese Buddhism include: the Lotus Sutra, the Flower Ornament Sutra, the Vimalakirtī Sutra, the Nirvana Sutra, and the Amitābha Sutra.   

As such, Chinese Buddhism follows the classic Mahāyāna Buddhist worldview, which includes belief in many realms of existence, the existence of many Buddhas and bodhisattvas (菩薩) as well as many other kinds of divine beings, ghosts and so on. Chinese Buddhism also upholds classic Mahāyāna Buddhist doctrines like karma and rebirth, the bodhisattva path, and the doctrines of emptiness (空, kōng), buddha-nature (佛性, fóxìng) and the one vehicle (一乘, yīchéng).    

When it comes to Buddhist philosophy, Chinese Buddhism contains various doctrinal traditions, the most important being the Tiantai, Huayan, Sanlun and Weishi schools of thought. These different doctrinal traditions developed their own scriptural commentaries and treatises and also various doctrinal classifications (panjiao) which hierarchically ordered the mass of Buddhist scriptures in order to advance their school's hermeneutical worldview. For example, according to master Zhiyi's "eight teachings and five periods" classification, the final and supreme teaching of the Buddha is found in the Lotus Sutra and the Nirvana Sutra. According to the Huayan masters like Fazang, the Huayan sutra contains the supreme teaching, while the Weishi school held that the Yogacara texts where the "third turning" of the Dharma, and thus the final and ultimate teaching of the Buddha.

Practices 

Chinese Buddhism contains a wide array of religious practices and observances. Ritual and devotional practices are commonly seen as generating karmic merit, which can bring about positive results in this life or the next.   

According to Mario Poceski, for the vast majority of ordinary Chinese Buddhists "prevalent expressions of Buddhist piety were (and still are) channeled via a variety of popular modes of worship and ritual observance." Worship services can include Buddhist devotional practices like offerings to an altar (of items like incense, flowers, food, and candles), ceremonial bowing, and extensive liturgies (including repentance ceremonies, rites for good health, and memorials for dead). According to Chün-fang Yü, the most popular Chinese Buddhist ritual that is most widely performed today is the Great Compassion Repentance associated with Guanyin and the Great Compassion Dharani.     

Keeping sets of ethical rules, like the classic Buddhist five precepts, are another key part of Buddhist practice. Taking up the ethical precepts in a ceremony, along with taking refuge in the three jewels (Buddha, Dharma and Sangha) is a common way of entering the Buddhist path. Another important set of ethical precepts is the “bodhisattva precepts” of the Brahmā’s Net Sutra, which are often practiced by both laity and monastics. Acts of charity or social service are also an important of part of Chinese Buddhist ethics.  

Another key part of Chinese Buddhism is engaging in Buddhist meditations such as chanting the Buddhas name (念佛, niànfó) which is the core practice of Pure Land Buddhism and seated meditation (坐禪, zuò chán), which is the focus of the Chan tradition. The practice of recitation of the Buddhas name is commonly done in a group setting, sometimes as part of an intensive nianfo recitation retreat, which can last for several days. These retreats might also include chanting sutras, taking of the eight precepts, silent meditation and Dharma lectures. 

Textual practices are also commonly practiced by monks and laypersons. These include printing, copying, propagating and reciting Buddhist scriptures, studying Buddhist texts, and attending lectures. Buddhist temples may also have special elements associated with sacred texts, such as lecture halls or dharma halls ( 法堂), libraries and scripture platforms (施法壇), a kind of sacred podium.  

Other important Buddhist rituals are those related to death, which is seen as a key moment for Buddhists who want to attain a good rebirth in the pure land of a Buddha (the most popular being Amitabha's pure land). The focus of these rituals is to keep the dying person free of distractions and offer spiritual support (so they can focus their minds on Amitabha Buddha through the repetition of the Buddha's name). It is commonly believed that during these rituals one can experiences auspicious signs like visions of Amitabha and bright lights.  

Pilgrimages to well-known monasteries and sites, like the Four Sacred Buddhist Mountains (Wǔtái Shān, Éméi Shān, Jǐuhuá Shān, Pǔtuó Shān) are also undertaken by monastics and lay practitioners alike. 

Another popular practice is the use of mantras and dhāraṇīs, such as the popular Mahā Karuṇā Dhāraṇī and the Cundī Dhāraṇī. Robert Gimello has also observed that in Chinese Buddhist communities, the esoteric practices of Cundī enjoyed popularity among both the common people and the elite.

Deities and temples 

Various Mahāyāna Buddhist deities are venerated in Chinese Buddhism, most of which are Buddhas (佛 fó) and bodhisattvas (菩薩 púsà). Some of the key figures include:  

 Śākyamuni (Shijiamoni, “sage of the śākyas”), the historical founder of Buddhism, commonly depicted with Ᾱnanda and Mahākāśyapa, or in a triad with Amitābha and Medicine Buddha.
 Avalokiteśvara, the bodhisattva of compassion who has various forms (such as the thousand arms form), the most popular being the motherly Guānyīn.
 Amitābha Buddha (pinyin: Ēmítuó fó, "Limitless Light") also called Amitāyus ("Limitless Life"), associated with the pure land of Sukhavati which many hope to reach after death
 Vairocana (Dàrì Rúlái), the cosmic primordial Buddha 
 Medicine Buddha (Yàoshī fó), associated with medicinal powers
 Maitreya bodhisattva (Mílè púsà), is seen as the Buddha of the future, sometimes depicted as a fat laughing Buddha
 Manjushri bodhisattva (Wénshū púsà), the bodhisattva of wisdom, associated with Mount Wutai, often appears mounted on a lion.
 Samantabhadra bodhisattva (Pǔxián púsà), often depicted riding an elephant, is associated with confession and repentance rites and the bodhisattva vows.
 Kṣitigarbha bodhisattva (Dìzàng púsà), the savior monk associated with rites for the deceased
 The Eighteen Arhats (Shíbā Luóhàn)
 The Four Great Heavenly Kings (Sìdà Tiānwáng)
 The Twenty-Four Protective Deities (Chinese: 二十四諸天; pinyin: Èrshísì Zhūtiān), a common ser of Chinese Buddhist protector deities (dharmapalas).

Chinese Buddhist temples usually include numerous images and statues of Buddhas and bodhisattvas. They are often ritually carved and installed as part of a consecration ritual that may include chanting and scripture reading. Devotion towards these are a major part of Chinese Buddhism. As Chün-fang Yü writes "people in China worship buddhas and bodhisattvas in rituals, write poems and novels about them, praise them in songs and hymns, and tell stories and stage plays about them. And above all else, they worship the images of these holy beings."  

According to Mario Poceski, Chinese Buddhist temples generally follow a traditional Chinese palace layout. They "consist of a series of halls and courtyards that are arranged symmetrically around a central axis, which usually runs from north to south. The main hall is typically a large building that is centrally located along the main axis. In larger monasteries or temples, a number of ancillary halls also house the images of lesser Buddhist divinities, giving residents and visitors alike a wide choice of objects of worship and supplication."

Another common structure is a pagoda which may contain Buddhist relics and statues or images of Buddhas and bodhisattvas.

Monasticism 

Buddhist monasticism is an important part of Chinese Buddhism. Chinese Buddhist monastics (both male and female) follow the Dharmaguptaka Vinaya, which is known as the Four Part Vinaya (Sifen lü) in China and has 250 rules for monks and 348 for nuns.

Buddhist monks and nuns perform numerous religious practices and services, including offerings to altars, liturgical services, circumambulating the Buddha hall, preaching the scriptures, Dharma lectures, rituals meals and chanting at mealtime, as well as confession and repentance rituals.

There have been many different types of monasteries throughout Chinese Buddhist history. There are city monasteries, country monasteries and monasteries deep in the mountains. Some monasteries may be large and rich, with thousands of monastics while others are small with just a few monastics. The most prestigious monasteries have support from rich elites, and the smallest are usually in small villages.

Vegetarianism 

Vegetarianism is widely promoted and practiced in Chinese Buddhism, though not all Chinese Buddhists are necessarily vegetarians. The monastic Vinaya does not require vegetarianism, but the practice is promoted in various Mahayana sutras, like the Lankavatara Sutra. 

Monastics are often required to be vegetarian and meat is often banned in Buddhist temples and monasteries. Other dietary restrictions may include avoiding eggs, dairy, and certain types of leeks. 

Devout laity are also often vegetarian. Some laypersons may practice vegetarian on certain sacred days, during religious retreats or on certain festivals. 

Temples and monasteries often have vegetarian dining halls and vegetarian feasts are a common feature of popular celebrations.

Laypeople in Chinese Buddhism

In Chinese Buddhism, lay Buddhist practitioners have traditionally played an important role, and lay practice of Buddhism has had similar tendencies to those of monastic Buddhism in China. Many historical biographies of lay Buddhists are available, which give a clear picture of their practices and role in Chinese Buddhism. In addition to these numerous biographies, there are accounts from Jesuit missionaries such as Matteo Ricci which provide extensive and revealing accounts to the degree Buddhism penetrated elite and popular culture in China.

Traditional practices such as meditation, mantra recitation, mindfulness of Amitābha Buddha, asceticism, and vegetarianism were all integrated into the belief systems of ordinary people. It is known from accounts in the Ming Dynasty that lay practitioners often engaged in practices from both the Pure Land and Chan traditions, as well as the study of the Buddhist sūtras.

Syncretism and multiple religious belonging 

Some types of Chinese Buddhism also include influences from native Chinese Religions, including Confucianism, Taoism and Chinese Folk Religion. This ecumenical attitude and embrace of religious pluralism has been a common feature of Chinese culture since ancient times. For example, Chinese Buddhists may practice qigong, tai chi and gongfu, venerate native Chinese deities (like Guan Yu, Mazu and Monkey King), engage in ancestor veneration, practice traditional Chinese medicine and make use of Feng shui and Chinese talismans. Chinese religions like Taoism and Confucianism were also in turn influenced by Chinese Buddhism.   

The ancient idea of the compatibility of the Three Teachings (Confucianism, Buddhism and Daoism) is common in China and is expressed in the phrase the three teachings harmonious as one. Chinese Buddhism developed Chinese mythologies and philosophies which incorporated and accommodated Chinese religions. For example, Chinese Buddhist apocryphal texts tell of how Laozi was actually a disciple of the Buddha and also how Confucius was a bodhisattva. Chinese Buddhist thinkers like Guifeng Zongmi argued that all three teachings should be followed and practiced since they all contain important truths (though he also considered Buddhism to reveal the highest truth). 

One such important element of Chinese Buddhism are religious practices focused on one's ancestors, something that is shared in common with other traditional Chinese religions. This can include paying respect to them at various sites and at festivals like the Qingming and Zhong Yuan Festival as well as participating in services to pray for one's deceased ancestors. 

The ritual burning of incense (shaoxiang, jingxiang) is another common religious practice in Buddhist spaces derived from traditional Chinese religion. During the Zhou dynasty, the Chinese believed that smoke resulting from burning of sandalwood would act as a bridge between the human world and the spirits. The practice remains a common offering in Chinese Buddhism, which it shared with other Chinese religions. 

Another common feature of Chinese religion is multiple religious belonging. As such, Chinese adherents may also practice Buddhism alongside other Chinese religious practices without seeing this as conflicting. According to Mario Poceski:many or even most people who actually come to worship at Buddhist temples are not hardcore believers. A good number of them assume the kinds of fuzzy or hybrid religious identities that are typical of Chinese religiosity; among other things, that can mean that many of them also worship at Daoist temples or shrines associated with popular religion. This is one of the reasons why it is very difficult to arrive at reliable data about the number of “ Buddhists ” in China. During the Tang and Yuan dynasties, Chinese Buddhism was also in proximity to Chinese branches of the Church of the East and Christianity in general, and competed with these traditions, especially in the Tang Dynasty.

Chinese, Tibetan, and Mongolian Buddhism were also significantly influenced by them as Mongolian Buddhism, influenced by Nestorian beliefs and Tibetan Buddhism, spread out during the Yuan dynasty. The three Buddhist traditions also heavily influenced each other at the time.

Traditions

Major Chinese Buddhist traditions 
Traditional Chinese Buddhist scholars like Sheng-yen enumerate thirteen Buddhist traditions or schools (Chinese: zōng). This list is also found in traditional Japanese Buddhist histories, particularly that of Gyōnen (1240–1321).

Over time, some of these schools survived or were revived as living traditions, while others are now defunct historical traditions or were absorbed into other schools. These "traditions" are not rigid designations and there has always been much intermixing and many temples and communities are influenced by many of these traditions (and also by local Chinese custom and traditional Chinese religions like Daoism). Some traditions may also have numerous sub-schools or sects.

The various Chinese Buddhist traditions are not exclusivist, and are better seen as trends, emphases, schools of thought or "dharma-gates" (法門, fǎmén), instead of as separate sects. Chün-fang Yü quotes a famous saying which describes the harmonious situation in Chinese Buddhism, "Tiantai and Huayan for doctrine, Chan and Pure Land for practice."

As Mario Poceski notes, Chinese Buddhism "lacks clear sectarian divisions of the kind we find in other Buddhist traditions". All Chinese monastics follow the same ordination procedures and monastic precepts, and as such there is no rigid separation between "schools" or "sects". While traditions like Chan and Tiantai are understood as distinctive teachings, they are all part of the single Chinese Buddhist tradition which is "characterized by broad - minded acceptance of a variety of styles of discourse, modes of worship, and approaches to spiritual cultivation." Due to Chinese Buddhism's acceptance of diversity, ecumenism and difference, most Chinese Buddhists would not identify themselves as being part of a specific "school". That being said, there are still disagreements and doctrinal debates within the community.  

The "thirteen schools" are: 

 The Chengshi school (historical) which focused on the study of the Tattvasiddhi-Śāstra ("The Treatise that Accomplishes Reality"; Chinese: 成實論, Chengshilun).
 The Kosa School (俱舍宗) (historical), based on the study of Abhidharma using the Abhidharmakośa of Vasubandhu.
 The "Three Treatises" school (三論, Sānlùn, Chinese Mādhyamaka) founded by Kumarajiva (344–413 CE).
 The Pure Land school (Chinese: 淨土宗; pinyin: Jìngtǔzōng) focused on rebirth in Amitabha's Pure Land.
 The Nirvana (Nièpán) school (historical) based on the Mahāyāna Mahāparinirvāṇa Sūtra (大般涅槃經; Dàbānnièpán-jīng) translated by Dharmarakṣa (c. 233-310), this was later absorbed into the Tiāntāi school. 
 The Dilun school (based on the Daśabhūmikā sutra translated by Bodhiruci), this was later absorbed into the Huáyán tradition.  
 The She lun school (based on Asanga’s Summary of the Mahayana translated by Paramartha), it was later absorbed into the Huáyán and Consciousness-only schools.  
 The Consciousness Only school (唯識宗; Wéishí, Yogācāra), a.k.a. Faxiang ("dharma characteristics") school, founded by Xuanzang (602-664) and based on his Chengweishilun (The Demonstration of Consciousness-only).
 The Tiāntāi school (天台宗), also known as the Lotus school (法華宗), due to their focus on the Lotus Sutra.
 The Huáyán school (華嚴宗), the school of the Avataṃsaka Sūtra (華嚴經; Huáyán jīng).
 The Vinaya school (四分律宗) or Nanshan school, a historical tradition which focused on the Dharmaguptaka monastic discipline, established by the monk Daoxuan (596–667). 
 The Chan (禪, Dhyana) school, i.e. the Zen tradition attributed to the founder Bodhidharma, which focuses on sitting meditation (坐禪, zuòchán) and developed numerous sub-schools like Caodong and Linji.
 The Zhenyan school (真言宗, "true word", "mantra" school), i.e. Chinese Esoteric Buddhism. Also called Mìjiao (密教; Esoteric Teaching), Mìzōng (密宗; "Esoteric Tradition") or Tángmì (唐密; "Tang Esoterica").
Many of these traditions were also later exported to other East Asian nations, like Japan, Korea and Vietnam.

According to Sheng-yen, the Chan school is the most popular school in China today, though this is often combined with Pure Land practice as well. Sheng-yen also notes that the Tiāntāi, Huáyán, Three Treatises, Consciousness Only, Vinaya and Esoteric traditions are also present in modern Chinese Buddhism, though to a lesser extent. 

There is also modernist movement called Humanistic Buddhism (人間佛教; rénjiān fójiào) which emphasizes humanism, charity and other humanitarian practices that help improve social conditions.

New religious movements
There are many sects and organisations proclaiming a Buddhist identity and pursuit (fo or fu: "awakening", "enlightenment") that are not recognised as legitimate Buddhism by the Chinese Buddhist Association and the government of the People's Republic of China. This group includes:

 Guanyin Buddhism [Awakening Teaching] ( Guānyīn Fójiào) or Guanyin Church ( Guānyīn Huì)
 True Buddha School ( Zhēnfó Zōng)
Buddhism [Awakening Teaching] of the Lord of Heaven of Infinite Thriving of the Mountain of Longevity ( Shòushān Wànlóng Tiānzhǔ Fójiào)
Wulian Jingang Dadao ("Great Way of the Innumerable Attendants of Awakening")
Hanmi Chinese esoteric buddhism, Living Buddha Dechan Jueren

Holidays and festivals 

Chinese Buddhists celebrate numerous religious festivals and holidays and these are the most widely attended and popular Chinese Buddhist events.

During religious festivals, Chinese people visit temples to take part in rituals, chanting, food, celebrations, parades and to make offerings of prayers, incense, fruits, flowers and donations. On such days they may observe the moral precepts very strictly as well as a full day's vegetarian diet. Some of the most important holidays celebrated by Chinese Buddhists include: Buddha's Birthday (on the eighth day of the fourth lunar month), Chinese New Year and the Lantern Festival (on the first and fifteenth days of the first lunar month), and the Ghost Festival (fifteenth day of the seventh lunar month).

List of Holidays 
The following holiday dates given are based on the Chinese calendar system so that 8.4 means the Eighth day of the fourth month in Chinese calendar and so on.
8.12 — Enlightenment Day of Śākyamuni Buddha
1.1 — Birthday of Maitreya Buddha
9.1 — Birthday of Śakra, Lord of the Devas
8.2 — Renunciation Day of Śākyamuni Buddha
15.2 — Mahāparinirvāṇa Day of Śākyamuni Buddha
19.2 — Birthday of Bodhisattva Avalokiteśvara (Guan Yin)
21.2 — Birthday of Bodhisattva Samantabhadra
4.4 — Birthday of Bodhisattva Mañjuśrī
8.4 — Birthday of Śākyamuni Buddha
15.4 — Vesak Day
13.5 — Birthday of Bodhisattva Sangharama (Qie Lan)
3.6 — Birthday of Skanda (Wei Tuo)
19.6 — Enlightenment Day of Bodhisattva Avalokiteśvara
13.7 — Birthday of Bodhisattva Mahāsthāmaprāpta
15.7 — Ullambana Festival Ghost Festival
24.7 — Birthday of Bodhisattva Nagarjuna
30.7 — Birthday of Bodhisattva Kṣitigarbha
22.8 — Birthday of Dīpaṃkara Buddha (an ancient buddha)
19.9 — Renunciation Day of Bodhisattva Avalokiteśvara
30.9 — Birthday of Bhaiṣajyaguru Buddha (Medicine Buddha)
5.10 — Anniversary of the death of Bodhidharma
17.11 — Birthday of Amitābha Buddha

See also

Notes

References

Citations

Sources 

 
 Chen, Kenneth Kuan Sheng. Buddhism in China: A Historical Survey. Princeton, N.J., Princeton University Press, 1964.
 
 Han Yu. Sources of Chinese Tradition. c. 800.
 
 
 Hill, John E. (2009) Through the Jade Gate to Rome: A Study of the Silk Routes during the Later Han Dynasty, 1st to 2nd Centuries CE. John E. Hill. BookSurge, Charleston, South Carolina. .
 
 
 
 
 Liebenthal, Walter. Chao Lun - The Treatises of Seng-Chao Hong Kong, China, Hong Kong University Press, 1968.
 Liebenthal, Walter. Was ist chinesischer Buddhismus Asiatische Studien: Zeitschrift der Schweizerischen Asiengesellschaft, 1952 Was ist chinesischer Buddhismus 
 
 
 Mullin, Glenn H. The Fourteen Dalai Lamas: A Sacred Legacy of Reincarnations (2001) Clear Light Publishers. .
 Saunders, Kenneth J. (1923). "Buddhism in China: A Historical Sketch", The Journal of Religion, Vol. 3.2, pp. 157–169; Vol. 3.3, pp. 256–275.
 Welch, Holmes. The Practice of Chinese Buddhism. Cambridge, Massachusetts: Harvard University Press, 1967.
 Welch, Holmes. The Buddhist Revival in China. Cambridge, Massachusetts: Harvard University Press, 1968.
 Welch, Holmes. Buddhism under Mao. Cambridge, Massachusetts: Harvard University Press, 1972.

Further reading

History
 
 
 
 Shinko Mochizuki, Leo M. Pruden, Trans. (1999). Pure Land Buddhism in China: A Doctrinal History, Chapter 1: A General Survey. In: Pacific World Journal, Third Series, Number 1, 91–103. Archived from the original
 Shinko Mochizuki, Leo M. Pruden, Trans. (2001). Pure Land Buddhism in China: A Doctrinal History, Chapter 2: The Earliest Period; Chapter 3: Hui-yuan of Mt.Lu; and Chapter 4: The Translation of Texts-Spurious Scriptures. In: Pacific World Journal, Third Series, Number 3, 241–275. Archived from the original
 Shinko Mochizuki, Leo M. Pruden, Trans. (2002). Pure Land Buddhism in China: A Doctrinal History, Chapter Five: The Early Pure Land Faith: Southern China, and Chapter Six: The Early Pure Land Faith: Northern China. In: Pacific World Journal, Third Series, Number 4, 259–279. Archived from the original
 Shinko Mochizuki, Leo M. Pruden, Trans. (2000). Pure Land Buddhism in China: A Doctrinal History, Chapter 7: T'an-luan. In: Pacific World Journal, Third Series, Number 2, 149–165. Archived from the original

First Buddhist revival

Contemporary Chinese Buddhism
 
 
 
 
 
 List first published in:

External links

China Buddhist Association
Timeline of China Buddhism
About Buddhism in China: A Selected Bibliography
Chinese Buddhism
the Confucian Impact on Chan Buddhism
Buddhist Studies net
Wisdom embodied: Chinese Buddhist and Daoist sculpture in the Metropolitan Museum of Art – a collection catalog from The Metropolitan Museum of Art Libraries (fully available online as PDF)

 
China
History of Buddhism in Asia